Pedro Fernández Cantero (born 29 April 1946) was a Paraguayan former footballer who played as a defender.

Career
Fernández spent his entire career in Spain with Barcelona and Granada. He joined La Liga side Barcelona in 1967 and went onto play eight times over two seasons with the club; his final match for Barcelona was a 1–1 draw with Valencia on 16 April 1969. Ahead of the 1969–70 campaign, Fernández joined fellow La Liga club Granada. He made his Granada debut in September 1969 in a 0–1 win versus Pontevedra. Fernández remained with Granada until 1978 which included two hundred and twenty appearances and five goals. He holds the record for most appearances in La Liga for Granada (172).

Career statistics
.

Honours
Barcelona
Copa del Generalísimo: 1967–68

References

External links

1946 births
Living people
People from Concepción, Paraguay
Paraguayan footballers
Association football defenders
Paraguayan expatriate footballers
Expatriate footballers in Spain
Paraguayan expatriate sportspeople in Spain
La Liga players
Segunda División players
FC Barcelona players
Granada CF footballers